Albert Seay (9 November 1916 – 7 January 1984) was an American musicologist who specialized in medieval and Renaissance music and theory. His publications included critical editions of works by the composers Jacques Arcadelt and Carpentras, and the theorists John Hothby, Johannes Tinctoris and Ugolino of Orvieto.

Life and career
Albert Seay was born on 9 November 1916 in Louisville, Kentucky. In 1937, he received both a Bachelor of Arts and Bachelor of Music at Murray State College. After receiving a Master of Music from Louisiana State University (1939), Seay briefly taught at the South-Western Louisiana Institute from 1946 to 1949. He continued his education at Yale University receiving a PhD in 1954 after studies with Leo Schrade. From 1953 until his retirement in 1982, Seay was on the faculty of Colorado College. Seay died in Colorado Springs, Colorado on 7 January 1984.

Seay chiefly specialized in the music and theory of medieval music and Renaissance music. He edited many critical editions of musicians from these periods, including the compositions of both Jacques Arcadelt and Carpentras, as well as the theoretical writings of John Hothby, Johannes Tinctoris and Ugolino of Orvieto. He was associated with American Institute of Musicology and served as editor of the Colorado College Music Press Series.

Selected bibliography

References

1916 births
1984 deaths
20th-century musicologists